Naval can refer to:
 Relating to a navy (a military branch that primarily uses ships and/or boats)
 Naval, Biliran, a municipality in the Philippines
 Naval, Huesca, a municipality in Spain
 Deepti Naval (born 1957), Indian actress
 Naval de Talcahuano, a defunct Chilean football team that was based in the city of Talcahuano
 Naval 1º de Maio, a sports club in Figueira da Foz, Portugal
 Naval Ravikant, Indian American entrepreneur

See also
 Navy (disambiguation)
 Navel, or belly button